Al Saudiya (previously known as Saudi TV Channel 1 and KSA 1), is a Saudi news and entertainment TV channel broadcasting in Arabic, owned by the Saudi Broadcasting Authority (SBA), which is state-run and is administered by the Ministry of Media.

Broadcasting throughout the Middle East, Europe and North America, KSA 1 officially began transmissions on 7 July 1965 in black and white from Riyadh and Jeddah until 1974, when color broadcasting was introduced in Jeddah and Mecca.

While the channel produces programmes focusing on cultural, political, and economic issues, it also shows of religious programmes and Islamic rituals. It is known for being the first channel to broadcast the Hajj pilgrimage, and has done so since the end of 1974.

References

External links

Livestream

Television stations in Saudi Arabia
Television channels and stations established in 1965